Thomas Stourton, 14th Baron Stourton (1667–1744) was a younger son of William Stourton.

Thomas succeeded his brother Edward in 1720. As Thomas died without children, he was succeeded by his nephew Charles in 1744.

Notes

References
 Kidd, Charles and Williamson, David (editors). Debrett's Peerage and Baronetage (1995 edition). London: St. Martin's Press, 1995, 

1744 deaths
14
1667 births
18th-century English people